Tim Hecker (born 28 September 1997) is a German sprint canoeist.

Career
He won a medal at the 2019 ICF Canoe Sprint World Championships. He represented Germany in the Tokyo 2020 Olympic Games and won a bronze medal in the Men's C-2 1000 metres event.

References

External links

1997 births
Living people
German male canoeists
ICF Canoe Sprint World Championships medalists in Canadian
Olympic canoeists of Germany
Canoeists at the 2020 Summer Olympics
Medalists at the 2020 Summer Olympics
Olympic medalists in canoeing
Olympic bronze medalists for Germany